Almaki (also Romanized as Almakī and Alamakī; also known as Alamgī and Almak) is a village in Soltaniyeh Rural District, Soltaniyeh District, Abhar County, Zanjan Province, Iran. At the 2006 census, its population was 420, in 98 families.

References 

Populated places in Abhar County